Smitten is a 1998 album by Buffalo Tom. It was their only album for Polydor Records.

Singer/guitarist Bill Janovitz said that, as the band members looked over demos in preparation for the album, they noticed that keyboards were taking a larger role in their songs than before.

Early in the process of putting the album together, the band spent time working with guitarist/keyboardist Tom Gorman, most well known as a member of Belly. Gorman pointed out that the band would probably be better served by a traditional keyboardist. Gorman was replaced by Phil Aiken after Janovitz spied his classified ad in a local weekly.

The album was produced by David Bianco, who was sought out by the band after being impressed by his work with Teenage Fanclub.

Track listing 
"Rachael" - 3:00
"Postcard" - 5:02
"Knot in It" - 5:23
"The Bible" - 4:31
"Scottish Windows" - 4:19
"White Paint Morning" - 3:17
"Wiser" - 4:54
"See to Me" - 2:57
"Register Side" - 4:16
"Do You In" - 4:45
"Under Milk Wood" - 3:50
"Walking Wounded" - 3:49

All songs by Buffalo Tom.

Personnel 
Buffalo Tom
Bill Janovitz - vocals, guitar
Chris Colbourn - bass
Tom Maginnis - drums

Charts

References 

Buffalo Tom albums
1998 albums
Beggars Banquet Records albums